Pishin (Urdu and ) or Pshin is a city that is the capital of  the Pishin District of Balochistan province, Pakistan. Pishin connects Quetta, the provincial capital to Pakistan. It is considered part of the Pashtun belt of Balochistan, and it is the largest district of Pashtun tribes.

History
Pishin was founded by the British Empire in 1883. It played a role in the Anglo-Afghan Wars. Local tribes from the area assisted in fighting the British by attacking British military convoys en route to Afghanistan. During World War II, the British built two air bases in the district; one near the town of Pishin and the other in Saranan.

Geography
Pishin is located in the northwest of Balochistan, in the east of the province near the border with Afghanistan. Tremors from the 2008 Ziarat earthquake were felt in the town.

Climate 
In the summer, temperatures can reach 40 °C (104 °F). In the winter, temperatures can decrease to below freezing.

Agriculture
The region is known in Balochistan for fruit production. It supplies a variety of fruits such as apples.

Demographics
Pishin's main ethnic groups are Pashtuns who belong to the Tareen, Syed, Kakar, and Achakzai tribes. In the city the majority of the population belongs to Tareen and Kakar.

Tribes
Pishin District is home to several tribes but following main tribes form the major population of the district:
 Tareen
 Kakar
 Syed
 Achakzai

Transport
Transport is mostly by car or bus. The town connects with Quetta, Khanozai, Barshore, and Saranan. In 1883, a major railway and road were constructed to connect towns in Pakistan and Afghanistan.

Notable people
 Qazi Muhammad Essa, senior leader of the Pakistan Movement and a close associate of Quaid-e-Azam 
 Jennifer Musa, politician and lady social worker 
 Jehangir Ashraf Qazi, diplomat, former Pakistani ambassador to the United States
 Qazi Faez Isa, Justice of the Supreme Court of Pakistan 
 Sultan Golden, motorcycle Stuntman
 Haseebullah Khan, cricketer

References

External links
 Pishin background
 Pishin: Britannica

Populated places in Balochistan, Pakistan
Pishin District